There were two major earthquakes in Afghanistan in 1998:

February 1998 Afghanistan earthquake
May 1998 Afghanistan earthquake